Leta Manasulu may refer to:
 Leta Manasulu (1966 film), an Indian Telugu-language film
 Letha Manasulu (2004 film), an Indian Telugu-language romantic drama film